Legislative elections were held in French Polynesia on 10 September 1967 for the Territorial Assembly. The result was a victory for pro-autonomy parties E'a Api and Pupu Here Ai'a, which won 16 of the 30 seats.

Background
The Democratic Rally of the Tahitian People, which had won the previous elections in 1962, was dissolved in November 1963.

Electoral system
The 30 members of the Territorial Assembly were elected from five constituencies; the Austral Islands (2 seats), the Leeward Islands (6), the Marquesas Islands (2), Tuamotu–Gambier Islands (4) and the Windward Islands (16).

Campaign
The main campaign issue was the question of self-governance. At one of its final meetings, the previous Assembly had debated proposals by Jean-Baptiste Céran-Jérusalémy that the territory should be an autonomous territory in the French Community, that a new flag should be created for the territory and used alongside the French flag and that Tahitian should become a co-official language alongside French. Assembly members voted to delay the decision until after the upcoming elections.

Following the Assembly debate, two new anti-autonomy parties were formed; the Democratic Polynesian Movement and Ia Ora O Polynesia. Other anti-autonomy parties included the Tahitian Union–Union for the New Republic alliance led by Rudy Bambridge and the Tahitian Democratic Union led by Alfred Poroi. Pro-autonomy parties included E'a Api led by Francis Sanford, Pupu Here Ai'a led by John Teariki and Te Oto I Te Nunaa led by Charles Poroi.

A total of 33 parties or party lists contested the elections, with 18 running in the Windward Islands. Pupu Here Ai'a was the only party to contest all five constituencies.

Results
Twenty of the thirty winning candidates were new to the Assembly. The five candidates from minor parties were considered pro-autonomy.

Elected members

Aftermath
Following the elections, E'a Api and Pupu Here Ai'a agreed to work together to form a government. The new Assembly opened on 1 November and elected the five-member Council of Government; the Tahitian Democratic Union voted with the governing parties, electing Leon Assaud, Jean Roy Bambridge, Jean Juventin, Jacques Laurey and André Lonfevre were elected.

Following the death of Marcel Hart in January 1969, he was replaced by Sam Koua. Rudy Bambridge left the Assembly in March 1969 and was replaced by Jacques Teuira. Ah Kong Sham Koua also entered the Assembly during its term.

References

French Polynesia
Elections in French Polynesia
1967 in French Polynesia
September 1967 events in Oceania
Election and referendum articles with incomplete results